Teder is a surname of Estonian origin, meaning "black grouse", and may refer to:

Hillar Teder (born 1962), Estonian businessman
Indrek Teder (born 1957), Estonian lawyer and jurist
Kristjan Teder (1901–1960), Estonian painter
Tarmo Teder (born 1958), Estonian writer, poet and critic

See also
Tedder, surname

Estonian-language surnames